Gary Murray (born 19 August 1959) is a Scottish former professional footballer who played as a forward. Gary is in the Montrose Hall of Fame.

Career
Born in Dundee, Murray played for Montrose (two spells), Hibernian and Forfar Athletic in the Scottish Football League.

Personal life
His son Simon is also a footballer, and also played for both Montrose and Hibernian. He has 3 more children named Eddie,Francesca and Laura.

References

1959 births
Living people
Scottish footballers
Hibernian F.C. players
Montrose F.C. players
Forfar Athletic F.C. players
Scottish Football League players
Association football forwards
Footballers from Dundee